Allotalanta tephroclystis is a moth in the  family Cosmopterigidae. It was described by Edward Meyrick in 1930. It is found in Cameroon.

References

Natural History Museum Lepidoptera generic names catalog

Endemic fauna of Cameroon
Moths described in 1930
Cosmopteriginae
Moths of Africa